Dávid Banai (born 9 May 1994 in Budapest) is a Hungarian football player who currently plays for Újpest.

Club statistics

Updated to games played as of 27 June 2020.

References

External links
 
 

1994 births
Living people
Footballers from Budapest
Hungarian footballers
Újpest FC players
Nemzeti Bajnokság I players
Association football goalkeepers
21st-century Hungarian people